Stadium–Armory is a Washington Metro station located in Southeast, Washington, D.C. The station was opened on July 1, 1977, and is operated by the Washington Metropolitan Area Transit Authority (WMATA). Stadium–Armory serves the Blue, Orange and Silver Lines. It is a transfer station, as this is the last station shared by the three lines before the lines diverge going east; east of the station, all three lines rise above ground onto elevated track to cross over the Anacostia River. At the diverge point, the Orange Line continues above ground veering northbound, and the Blue and Silver Lines continue eastbound entering a tunnel.

Location 

The Stadium–Armory station serves the Barney Circle and Kingman Park neighborhoods. It also serves the Capitol Hill neighborhood's eastern edge, which has been re-established as "Hill East".  It was adjacent to the now-defunct RFK Stadium, which was the former home of the D.C. United soccer team, the Washington Redskins, and the Washington Nationals, as well as of the second Washington Senators franchise before their relocation to Texas in 1972. The station also serves the D.C. Jail, and D.C. Armory, which is both a popular venue for shows and entertainment and the headquarters of the District of Columbia National Guard.  Together with the Potomac Avenue station, Stadium-Armory is one of two Metro stations within walking distance of Congressional Cemetery. Before its closure in 2001, D.C. General Hospital was served by the Stadium–Armory station.

With the redevelopment of the former D.C. General Hospital campus into a mixed-use waterfront neighborhood, the Hill East neighborhood around the Stadium–Armory station will be in transition for the first few decades of the twenty-first century. Additionally, with the move of D.C. United to a new soccer-specific stadium, Audi Field, in the Buzzard Point area of Washington in July 2018, the future of RFK Stadium is uncertain, with the possibility of demolition lingering over the 1960s-era facility. As of July, 2022, EventsDC announced the demolition of RFK Stadium to be completed by 2023.

History

The station opened on July 1, 1977. Orange Line service to the station began upon the line's opening on November 20, 1978. Since then, the station has been the last underground station on the eastern end of the Orange Line, while Ballston-MU is the last on the western end. In 1979, the D.C. Armory requested that the station name be changed to "Starplex", For Stadium Armory Complex, but that request was ignored by the Metro Board.

Silver Line service at Stadium-Armory began on July 26, 2014.

Between May 28 and September 5, 2022, all Orange Line trains were terminating at Stadium–Armory station due to the Platform Improvement Project which closed stations north of Stadium–Armory station. On weekends, all Blue and Silver Line trains were terminating Stadium–Armory while Orange Line trains were cutback to  due to aerial structure repairs along the D route.

Transformer fire 
On September 21, 2015, a transformer caught fire near the station, causing severe delays. The reduced power as a result of the loss of the transformer caused WMATA to implement strategies to combat congestion in the system. This included having Orange and Silver line trains skip the Stadium–Armory station during rush hours, but service had been restored as of November.

Station layout 
Stadium-Armory is an island platform station with two tracks. Track D1 is for eastbound trains to New Carrollton or Largo Town Center, and track D2 is for westbound trains to Vienna, Franconia–Springfield, or Ashburn. An indicator sign at the north end of the station flashes to inform passengers of the arriving train's destination, showing Orange for New Carrollton, and Blue and Silver for Largo Town Center. This feature is only used at final transfer stations; another example being Rosslyn station.                

The station has two entrances along 19th Street SE; the north entrance at Independence Avenue and the south entrance between C & Burke Streets SE. Elevator access is at the south entrance.

Notable places nearby
D.C. Armory
Eastern High School
Kingman and Heritage Islands Park
Lincoln Park
Congressional Cemetery
Anacostia Riverwalk Trail
National Arboretum is accessible via B2 Metrobus

References

External links

 The Schumin Web Transit Center: Stadium–Armory Station
 C Street entrance from Google Maps Street View
 Independence Avenue entrance from Google Maps Street View

Stations on the Blue Line (Washington Metro)
Stations on the Orange Line (Washington Metro)
Stations on the Silver Line (Washington Metro)
Washington Metro stations in Washington, D.C.
Railway stations in the United States opened in 1977
1977 establishments in Washington, D.C.
Railway stations located underground in Washington, D.C.
Southeast (Washington, D.C.)